Anton Michael Rodgers (born 26 January 1993) is an English-born Irish footballer who plays as a midfielder for Isthmian League South Central Division side Basingstoke Town.

Club career
After departing the youth setup at Chelsea in May 2011, Rodgers joined the academy of recently promoted Championship club Brighton & Hove Albion, signing an initial one-year contract with the option of a further year which was taken up by the club in the summer of 2012. Rodgers made his professional debut and only appearance for Brighton in an FA Cup match against Wrexham on 7 January 2012. On 20 March 2013, Rodgers joined League Two side Exeter City on an initial two-month loan deal. Rodgers made his professional League début for Exeter on 9 April during a 4–1 defeat at Rotherham United, appearing as a 70th-minute substitute. On 21 May 2013, Rodgers was released by Brighton, along with former Chelsea teammate Ben Sampayo.

On 12 July 2013, Rodgers signed for League One side Oldham Athletic on a one-year contract. On 10 August 2013, Rodgers made his Oldham debut in their 1–0 home defeat against Walsall, replacing James Dayton in the 74th minute. On 3 September 2013, Rodgers was given his first Oldham start in their Football League Trophy away tie against Shrewsbury Town, featuring for 71 minutes before being replaced by David Mellor. The game resulted in a 4–1 victory for the visitors with Danny Philliskirk scoring a hat-trick. Rodgers was released by Oldham at the end of the 2013–14 season after limited appearances in the first team.

On 17 July 2014, preceding his release from Oldham, Rodgers joined League One side Swindon Town. On 23 September 2014, Rodgers made his Swindon debut in a Football League Trophy 2–1 victory over Newport County, in which he replaced Louis Thompson in the 58th minute. A month later, Rodgers scored on his league debut for the club in their 3–2 home defeat against Rochdale, netting the game's opener in the 35th minute.

In June 2017, Celtic manager Brendan Rodgers fielded his son, Anton, as a trialist during the Scottish champions' 1–0 friendly win over BW Linz in Austria.
He was a free agent after leaving Swindon Town.

On 3 November 2017, Rodgers joined National League South side Hungerford Town following his release from Swindon. Following a lack of game time, Rodgers opted to leave Hungerford; however, just two months later he rejoined the club.

In July 2018, Rodgers was fielded as a trialist for Peterborough United in their pre-season friendlies.

In September 2018, he joined Falkirk on trial after leaving Hungerford at the end of the 2017/18 season.

Rodgers featured for Wealdstone and Bracknell Town during the 2018–19 season. On 19 August 2019, Rodgers joined Marlow.

On 1 October 2021, Basingstoke Town announced the signing of Rodgers for the 2021-22 season.

International career
Rodgers has been capped twice by the Republic of Ireland U19, making his debut against Luxembourg on 7 October 2010. He is eligible to play for England through birth, and Northern Ireland or the Republic of Ireland through parentage.

Personal life
Rodgers is the son of Leicester City manager Brendan Rodgers.

Career statistics

References

1993 births
Living people
Republic of Ireland association footballers
Republic of Ireland youth international footballers
English footballers
English people of Irish descent
English people of Northern Ireland descent
Chelsea F.C. players
Brighton & Hove Albion F.C. players
Exeter City F.C. players
Oldham Athletic A.F.C. players
Swindon Town F.C. players
Hungerford Town F.C. players
Wealdstone F.C. players
Bracknell Town F.C. players
Marlow F.C. players
Basingstoke Town F.C. players
National League (English football) players
Isthmian League players
English Football League players

Association football midfielders